Mink Beauty, LLC, is a 3D printing company based in New York. The company created a 3D printer allows users to select any color and print it into an eye shadow pod.

Mink was founded by Harvard grad Grace Choi and debuted at TechCrunch's Disrupt conference in May 2014. The printer combines ink with a variety of substrates to "create any type of makeup, from powders to cream to lipstick," according to Choi. All ink used by Mink is FDA-approved.

The printer was initially estimated to retail at $300.

References

External links
Mink Printer User Manual — how it works, from official Mink website.

3D printing
Technology companies of the United States
Manufacturing companies based in New York (state)
Technology companies established in 2014
Manufacturing companies established in 2014
2014 establishments in New York (state)
Cosmetics companies of the United States